The World League eSport Bundesliga was a German professional electronic sports league featuring the Counter-Strike, Counter-Strike: Source and FIFA 06 series. It has its own TV-show, broadcast by the German television channel Deutsches Sportfernsehen. Jana Ina and Giovanni Zarrella are the hosts of the show. The only game that was played at the season World League eSport Bundesliga was FIFA 06. The competitors fought for prize money of €50,000. From December 2005 until May 2006 there was a postseason, in which prize money of €45,825 was paid out.

League structure 
The structure of the World League eSport Bundesliga is based on the German Bundesliga. Each league consists of 18 players and all games of the first Bundesliga are played at the CineStar IMAX it the Sony Center in Berlin.

Besides the five leagues there is the ESBL Trophy which is similar to the DFB-Pokal. All Contesters of the 1. Bundesliga, 2. Bundesliga, 3. Bundesliga and Oberliga take part in this tournament. At the Quarterfinals and above the matches are also played in the so-called eSportstadium at the CineStar IMAX it the Sony Center in Berlin.

Previous winners

Season 2005/2006

Counter-Strike 
 ESBL Masters: Team 64 AMD
 1. Bundesliga: mousesports
 ESBL Trophy: ID Gaming

Counter-Strike:Source 
 1. Bundesliga: Team Dignitas

FIFA 2005 
 1. Bundesliga: SK Gaming
 ESBL Trophy:  SK Gaming

References

External links
 World League eSport Bundesliga
 World League eSport

FIFA (video game series) competitions
Counter-Strike competitions
Video game organizations
2005 establishments in Germany
Sports leagues in Germany
Defunct esports competitions